Tessie Jean Harper  (née Washam; born August 15, 1950) is an American actress. She was nominated for the Golden Globe Award for Best Supporting Actress for her first film role in 1983's Tender Mercies, and for the Academy Award for Best Supporting Actress for the 1986 film Crimes of the Heart. Her other film appearances include Flashpoint (1984), Ishtar (1987), Far North (1988), and No Country for Old Men (2007). She also had a recurring role on the first three seasons of Breaking Bad (2008–2010).

Early life 
Harper was born in Mammoth Spring, Arkansas, the daughter of Rosemary and Ed Washam, who operated Washam's Hardware. Harper has a brother and sister.  She attended Southwest Missouri State University (now Missouri State University) in Springfield, Missouri, graduated with a degree in education, and taught ninth-grade English in Springfield, Missouri.

Career 
Harper began acting in theater productions, theme parks (including Dogpatch, USA and Silver Dollar City), dinner theater, and children's theater. She moved to Texas in order to appear in television commercials. The institution wanted to produce a TV spot and asked her to be in the spot, which she accepted. In a twist of fate, a casting person with Tender Mercies had to spend the night in Dallas and saw Harper's spot on TV. She called Robert Duvall and arranged an audition. Director Bruce Beresford was impressed with Harper and cast her in the lead female role of Rosa Lee, the young widow and mother who marries country singer Mac Sledge. Beresford said that Harper brought a kind of rural quality to the role without coming across as simple or foolish. He said of Harper, "She walked into the room and even before she spoke, I thought, 'That's the girl to play the lead.'" Harper did not realize this, and recalled shortly after the film's release, "After I did the final screen test, I went to see Breaker Morant and started sobbing uncontrollably halfway through it. A friend had to take me home, and I kept crying, 'You don't understand! They're not gonna let me do this part!'"

Tender Mercies was Harper's feature film debut. She earned a Golden Globe Award nomination for the role. 

Harper appeared in the TV mini-series Chiefs (1983) and Celebrity (1984), as well as many television movies including Starflight: The Plane That Couldn't Land (1983) and Reckless Disregard (1985). In 1983, she appeared in the full-length feature Silkwood. In 1986, Harper was nominated for the Academy Award for Best Supporting Actress for her work as Chick Boyle in Crimes of the Heart, which was directed by her Tender Mercies director Bruce Beresford. She later played parts in Ishtar (1987),  Far North (1988), The Man in the Moon (1991), The Jackal (1997) and Loggerheads (2005). She also took part in Michael Jackson's music video "Black or White" (1991), playing the mother.

From 1994 to 1995 Harper had a regular role on the CBS series Christy, playing mountain woman Fairlight Spencer.   She also had a recurring role on another CBS television series, Early Edition, from 1996 to 2000. She portrayed the mother of lead character Gary Hobsen. Harper shared a Screen Actors Guild Award (in the Best Ensemble Cast category) with her fellow cast members in the Oscar-winning film No Country for Old Men, in which she played the wife of Tommy Lee Jones's character.

She had the recurring role of Mrs. Pinkman on Breaking Bad, appearing in the first three seasons.

Filmography

Film

Television

Awards and nominations

References

External links 

Encyclopedia of Arkansas bio

1950 births
20th-century American actresses
21st-century American actresses
Actresses from Arkansas
American film actresses
American television actresses
Arkansas State University alumni
Living people
Missouri State University alumni
Outstanding Performance by a Cast in a Motion Picture Screen Actors Guild Award winners
People from Fulton County, Arkansas